is a Japanese garden in Kyoto, owned by political and military leader Gensui Prince Yamagata Aritomo, designed by Ogawa Jihei and built between 1894 and 1898. It is an example of a classical Japanese promenade garden of the Meiji Period.

History
Gensui Prince Yamagata Aritomo (1838-1922) was an important figure in the politics and military affairs of the Meiji Period.  Born into an old samurai family and devoted to military affairs, he traveled to Europe in 1869 as part of a delegation of experts to study the Prussian Army, and when he returned he helped re-organize the Imperial Japanese Army on the Prussian model. He became Minister of War in 1873, and was twice Prime Minister of Japan, from 1889 to 1891 and from 1898 to 1900.

The completion in 1890 of the Lake Biwa Canal brought a plentiful source of fresh water to the Nanzen-ji temple domain area in Kyoto. Yamagata, who was a great lover of gardens, purchased land in the area and made plans to build a villa and garden using water from the canal and it's associated irrigation network. The then Count Yamagata (he was elevated in the Kazoku to being a Marquis in August 1895, and a Prince in September 1907) began work on the gardens in 1894, but stopped shortly afterwards due to his involvement in the First Sino-Japanese War. Yamagata ordered work to resume when the war was finished this time enlisting the help of the notable garden designer Ogawa Jihei (1860-1933), also known as Ueji, who had built the garden of the recreated Kyoto Imperial Palace nearby. In addition to the garden, he built a tea house, a traditional Japanese house, and a modern western-style house, complete with a lawn in the English style, added in 1898.

Description
The garden is sited on the slopes of the Higashiyama Hills, and has a source of water by a canal from Lake Biwa, the largest lake in Japan, which feeds a shallow artificial stream, with a triple waterfall which runs through the garden.  The garden covers 3135 square meters and features contrasts between shady forests and sunlit open spaces, and a long promenade to see the different sights of the garden, including many views of the Higashiyama Hills.

References

Bibliography

External links

 Murin-an official website 
 Kyoto City information page 

Buildings and structures in Kyoto
Gardens in Kyoto Prefecture
Important Cultural Properties of Japan
Tourist attractions in Kyoto